The Amsterdam Tournament 2009  was the 11th Amsterdam Tournament, a pre-season football tournament which is contested from club teams from all over Western Europe. The 2009 tournament was contested by Ajax, Sunderland, Benfica, and Atlético Madrid. It was won for the first time by Portuguese side Benfica.

Table

NB: An extra point is awarded for each goal scored.

Matches

Day 1

Day 2

References

2009 
2009–10 in Dutch football
2009–10 in Portuguese football
2009–10 in Spanish football
2009–10 in English football

it:Torneo di Amsterdam#2009